Emilio Meraz (born 22 May 1909, date of death unknown) was a Mexican épée fencer. He competed at the 1948 and 1952 Summer Olympics.

References

External links
 

1909 births
Year of death missing
Mexican male épée fencers
Olympic fencers of Mexico
Fencers at the 1948 Summer Olympics
Fencers at the 1952 Summer Olympics
20th-century Mexican people